Vida Petrović-Škero (born 15 March 1952 in Belgrade) is a Serbian Supreme Court judge. She served as the President of the Supreme Court of the Republic of Serbia between 2005 and 2009.

Biography
She graduated from Twelfth Belgrade Gymnasium in 1970. In 1974 she graduated from the University of Belgrade's Law Faculty and in 1976 she passed the bar exam.

In her legal career Vida Petrović-Škero worked as the professional associate at the Second Municipal Court in Belgrade between 1976 and 1978. In 1978 she was appointed judge at the same court where she worked until 1995 and headed the civil disputes division. Between 1995 and 2000 she worked as a judge at the District Court in Belgrade. She was dismissed from the judges post in July 2000 during last months of Slobodan Milošević presidency and she worked as a lawyer until 2001. National Assembly of Serbia annulled the decision of her dismissal in 2001 and appointed Petrović-Škero as a President of the District Court in Belgrade. In 2002 she was elected Justice at the Supreme Court of Serbia and in 2005 she was appointed President of the Supreme Court.

References

1955 births
Living people
Serbian women lawyers
University of Belgrade Faculty of Law alumni
20th-century Serbian judges
21st-century Serbian judges